Kasey Badger is an Australian rugby league referee and the first woman to referee a match in the Men's Rugby League World Cup.

Raised in Parramatta, Badger took up refereeing at an early age after having to make the decision between being a player or an official.

Having worked her way through the junior ranks, Badger was refereeing matches in the NSW Cup when she was one of the first two women (along with Belinda Sharpe) appointed to the National Rugby League (NRL) team of full-time officials in 2019.  Since then, Badger has been a touch judge in the NRL and has refereed games in the NRL Women's Premiership (NRLW) including the 2018, 2019 and 2022 NRLW Grand Finals.

Badger's first experience as an international referee was in 2012 when she and her husband Gavin were the two referees in a match between Thailand and the Philippines.

References

1987 births
Living people
21st-century Australian women
Australian rugby league referees
Rugby League World Cup referees
Australian women referees and umpires
People from Parramatta
Sportswomen from New South Wales
Sportspeople from Sydney